Lauris Bērziņš is a Latvian luger who competed from 2005 to 2007. His best Luge World Cup season finish was 20th in men's doubles in 2006-07.

Bērziņš' best finish at the FIL European Luge Championships was 20th in men's doubles at Winterberg in 2006.

References
 FIL-Luge profile: Berzins, Lauris

Latvian male lugers
Living people
Year of birth missing (living people)